is a railway station in the city of Nakatsugawa City, Gifu Prefecture, Japan, operated by Central Japan Railway Company (JR Tōkai).

Lines

Layout
The station has one ground-level  island platform connected to the station building by a footbridge. The station is unattended.

Platforms

Adjacent stations

|-
!colspan=5|

History
Ochiaigawa Station was opened on 27 November 1917. On 1 April 1987, it became part of JR Tōkai.

Surrounding area
Site of Ochiai-juku

See also
 List of Railway Stations in Japan

External links

Railway stations in Japan opened in 1917
Railway stations in Gifu Prefecture
Stations of Central Japan Railway Company
Chūō Main Line
Nakatsugawa, Gifu